"Remedy" is a song by South African rock band Seether. It is the second track on their album Karma and Effect, and was released as the album's lead single. It became their first single to hit the top spot on the Billboard Hot Mainstream Rock Tracks chart, dropping and regaining the spot for a total of eight weeks at number one.

Music video
The music video, directed by Dean Karr, features the band playing on the deck of a ship that appears to have run aground with fans who were selected via a contest on the band's website to appear in the shallow water below. Interspersed are shots of singer Shaun Morgan dressed up as an evil carnival barker taking a group of people on "the world's most terrifying ride". At the end of the video, the people that boarded the boat emerge from a tunnel, transformed into skeletons.

Appearances in media

"Remedy" served as the theme song for WWE's pay-per-view Summerslam 2005.

It is a playable song in the video game Guitar Hero On Tour: Decades.

It was released as a downloadable song in the Rock Band Network on March 18, 2010.

The song also appeared in the racing game Test Drive Unlimited (PC version only).

Track listing

Chart positions

Certifications

References

2005 singles
Seether songs
2005 songs
Wind-up Records singles
Songs written by Shaun Morgan
Song recordings produced by Bob Marlette